National Highway 161G, commonly referred to as NH 161G is a national highway in  India. It is a spur road of National Highway 61. NH-161G traverses the states of Madhya Pradesh and Maharashtra in India.

Route 
Patur, Balapur, Shegaon, Sangrampur, Jalgaon Jamod, Khaknar.

Junctions  

  Terminal near Patur.
  Terminal near Khaknar.

See also 

 List of National Highways in India
 List of National Highways in India by state

References

External links 

 NH 161G on OpenStreetMap

National highways in India
National Highways in Maharashtra
National Highways in Madhya Pradesh